Bartlett Building may refer to:

 Bartlett Building (Cincinnati)
 Bartlett Building (Los Angeles)
 Bartlett Building (University College, London)